Beatrice Elin Elisabeth Blennberger (born 9 January 1987), better known by her stage name Beatrice Eli, is a Swedish musician from Stockholm, Sweden. She first gained attention with her 2012 single "The Conqueror", which was released on her debut EP It's Over. The EP contained 4 songs and was released in October 2012. Beatrice Eli's debut album, Die Another Day, was released on October 22, 2014, through Razzia Records.

Eli says she was raised by deeply religious Christian parents, and her style is different to theirs. She told a journalist that "they understand that I didn't become the nice Church girl they wanted me to be." As for her songwriting, she says, "I've always written about my feelings." She says Die Another Day "is about sex, drugs and girls."

She is a lesbian and prefers that term over gay, as she told a journalist in 2015. Beatrice has been in a relationship with Swedish rapper Silvana Imam since 2014. She features on the track "Shhh" on Imam's second album Naturkraft, released in 2016. Beatrice's single "Careful" from the Careful EP was nominated for "Song of The Year" at the Gaffa Awards 2018.

Discography

Albums

Extended plays

Collaborations 
Eli was featured on the song Godhet by Swedish rock band Kent in their 2014 album, Tigerdrottningen.  She performed live with the group during performances that summer.

References 

Living people
1987 births
Swedish women singer-songwriters
English-language singers from Sweden
Swedish lesbian musicians
Lesbian songwriters
Lesbian singers
Swedish LGBT songwriters
Swedish LGBT singers
21st-century Swedish women singers